Chautauqua was an American social movement for arts and education in the 19th and 20th centuries.

Chautauqua, an Erie word, may also refer to:

Businesses and organizations 
Chautauqua Airlines, a defunct American regional airline in Indiana
Chautauqua Institution, an operational, New-York-based, non-profit center—which founded the movement

Places in the United States

Illinois 
Chautauqua, Illinois, a private summer resort
Chautauqua National Wildlife Refuge, on the Illinois River in Mason County

Kansas 
Chautauqua, Kansas, a city
Chautauqua County, Kansas

Mississippi 
Chautauqua Lake (Copiah County, Mississippi)
Lake Chautauqua (Tippah County, Mississippi)

New York 
Chautauqua County, New York
Chautauqua, New York, a town and lake resort
Chautauqua (CDP), New York, a census-designated place covering the Chautauqua Institution
Chautauqua Lake

Other states 
Chautauqua, Ohio, a town
Chautauqua Park, a public space in Boulder, Colorado
Chautauqua Park Historic District, a neighborhood in Des Moines, Iowa
Chautauqua Lake, Pinellas County, Florida

Sports 

Chautauqua (horse), a retired Australian racehorse (foaled 2010)

See also 
21st-century Chautauquas, a list of present-day Chautauquas
Chadakoin River, an outlet of Chautauqua Lake (named with an alternate transliteration of the same Erie word)
New Chautauqua, a music album by Pat Metheny